Ouratea patelliformis is a species of plant in the family Ochnaceae. It is endemic to Panama.

References

patelliformis
Endemic flora of Panama
Data deficient plants
Taxonomy articles created by Polbot